Asimov on Science Fiction is a 1981 non-fiction work by American writer and scientist Isaac Asimov. It is a collection of short essays dealing with various aspects of science fiction. Many of the essays are (slightly edited versions of) editorials from Isaac Asimov's Science Fiction Magazine.

Contents
Asimov wrote forewords to the essays in order to bind the collection together and grouped them in the following sections:
 Science Fiction in General
 The Writing of Science Fiction
 The Predictions of Science Fiction
 The History of Science Fiction
 Science Fiction Writers
 Science Fiction Fans
 Science Fiction Reviews
 Science Fiction and I

Reception
Dave Langford reviewed Asimov on Science Fiction for White Dwarf #47, and stated that "If you enjoy Asimov's good-humoured essay style, and don't mind bittiness and repetition, this is an interesting collection to dip into."

Reviews
Review by Gene DeWeese (1981) in Science Fiction Review, Winter 1981
Review by Tom Staicar (1982) in Amazing Science Fiction Stories, January 1982
Review by Jim England (1984) in Vector 120
Review by Joseph Nicholas (1984) in Paperback Inferno, #51

References

1983 books
Books of literary criticism
Essay collections by Isaac Asimov
Science fiction books
Scientific essays
Works originally published in Asimov's Science Fiction